Filip Pešán (born January 4, 1978) is a former Czech ice hockey player who played as a striker. He gained fame as a coach. Since 2020, he has been the head coach of the Czech Republic men's national ice hockey team.

His wife is a former Czech skier Lucie Hrstková-Pešánová.

References

External links
 Filip Pešán at eliteprospects.com
 Filip Pešán on hokej.cz

1978 births
Living people
Czech expatriate ice hockey players in Switzerland
Czech ice hockey forwards
Czech ice hockey coaches
Czech Republic men's national ice hockey team coaches
HC Bílí Tygři Liberec players
Ice hockey coaches at the 2022 Winter Olympics